In 1850, Léon Foucault used a rotating mirror to perform a differential measurement of the speed of light in water versus its speed in air. In 1862, he used a similar apparatus to measure the speed of light in air.

Background

In 1834, Charles Wheatstone developed a method of using a rapidly rotating mirror to study transient phenomena, and applied this method to measure the velocity of electricity in a wire and the duration of an electric spark. He communicated to François Arago the idea that his method could be adapted to a study of the speed of light.

The early-to-mid 1800s were a period of intense debate on the particle-versus-wave nature of light. Although the observation of the Arago spot in 1819 may have seemed to settle the matter definitively in favor of Fresnel's wave theory of light, various concerns continued to appear to be addressed more satisfactorily by Newton's corpuscular theory. Arago expanded upon Wheatstone's concept in an 1838 publication, suggesting that a differential comparison of the speed of light in air versus water would serve to distinguish between the particle and wave theories of light.

Foucault had worked with Hippolyte Fizeau on projects such as using the Daguerreotype process to take images of the Sun between 1843 and 1845 and characterizing absorption bands in the infrared spectrum of sunlight in 1847. In 1845, Arago suggested to Fizeau and Foucault that they attempt to measure the speed of light. Sometime in 1849, however, it appears that the two had a falling out, and they parted ways. In 1848−49, Fizeau used, not a rotating mirror, but a toothed wheel apparatus to perform an absolute measurement of the speed of light in air.

In 1850, Fizeau and Foucault both used rotating mirror devices to perform relative measures of the speed of light in air versus water.

Foucault employed Paul-Gustave Froment to build a rotary-mirror apparatus in which he split a beam of light into two beams, passing one through water while the other traveled through air. On 27 April 1850, he confirmed that the speed of light was greater as it traveled through air, seemingly validating the wave theory of light.

With Arago's blessing, Fizeau employed L.F.C. Breguet to construct his apparatus. They achieved their result on 17 June 1850, seven weeks after Foucault.

To achieve the high rotational speeds necessary, Foucault abandoned clockwork and used a carefully balanced steam-powered apparatus designed by Charles Cagniard de la Tour. Foucault originally used tin-mercury mirrors, however at speeds exceeding 200 rps, the reflecting layer would break off, so he switched to using new silver mirrors.

Foucault's determination of the speed of light

1850 experiment

In 1850, Léon Foucault measured the relative speeds of light in air and water. The experiment was proposed by Arago, who wrote, 

The apparatus (Figure 1) involves light passing through slit S, reflecting off a mirror R, and forming an image of the slit on the distant stationary mirror M. The light then passes back to mirror R and is reflected back to the original slit. If mirror R is stationary, then the slit image will reform at S.

However, if the mirror R is rotating, it will have moved slightly in the time it takes for the light to bounce from R to M and back, and the light will be deflected away from the original source by a small angle, forming an image to the side of the slit.

Foucault measured the differential speed of light through air versus water by using two distant mirrors (Figure 2). He placed a 3 meter tube of water before one of them. The light passing through the slower medium has its image more displaced. By partially masking the air-path mirror, Foucault was able to distinguish the two images super-imposed on top of one another. He found the speed of light was slower in water than in air.

This experiment did not determine the absolute speeds of light in water or air, only their relative speeds. The rotational speed of the mirror could not be sufficiently accurately measured to determine the absolute speeds of light in water or air. With a rotational speed of 600-800 revolutions per second, the displacement was 0.2 to 0.3 mm.

Guided by similar motivations as his former partner, Foucault in 1850 was more interested in settling the particle-versus-wave debate than in determining an accurate absolute value for the speed of light. His experimental results, announced shortly before Fizeau announced his results on the same topic, were viewed as "driving the last nail in the coffin" of Newton's corpuscle theory of light when it showed that light travels more slowly through water than through air. Newton had explained refraction as a pull of the medium upon the light, implying an increased speed of light in the medium. The corpuscular theory of light went into abeyance, completely overshadowed by wave theory. This state of affairs lasted until 1905, when Einstein presented heuristic arguments that under various circumstances, such as when considering the photoelectric effect, light exhibits behaviors indicative of a particle nature.

For his efforts, Foucault was made chevalier of the Légion d'honneur, and in 1853 was awarded a doctorate from the Sorbonne.

1862 experiment

In Foucault's 1862 experiment, he desired to obtain an accurate absolute value for the speed of light, since his concern was to deduce an improved value for the astronomical unit. At the time, Foucault was working at the Paris Observatory under Urbain le Verrier. It was le Verrier's belief, based on extensive celestial mechanics calculations, that the consensus value for the speed of light was perhaps 4% too high. Technical limitations prevented Foucault from separating mirrors R and M by more than about 20 meters. Despite this limited path length, Foucault was able to measure the displacement of the slit image (less than 1 mm) with considerable accuracy. In addition, unlike the case with Fizeau's experiment (which required gauging the rotation rate of an adjustable-speed toothed wheel), he could spin the mirror at a constant, chronometrically determined speed.  Foucault's measurement confirmed le Verrier's estimate. His 1862 figure for the speed of light (298000 km/s) was within 0.6% of the modern value.

As seen in Figure 3, the displaced image of the source (slit) is at an angle 2θ from the source direction.

Michelson's refinement of the Foucault experiment

It was seen in Figure 1 that Foucault placed the rotating mirror R as close as possible to lens L so as to maximize the distance between R and the slit S. As R rotates, an enlarged image of slit S sweeps across the face of the distant mirror M. The greater the distance RM, the more quickly that the image sweeps across mirror M and the less light is reflected back. Foucault could not increase the RM distance in his folded optical arrangement beyond about 20 meters without the image of the slit becoming too dim to accurately measure.

Between 1877 and 1931, Albert A. Michelson made multiple measurements of the speed of light. His 1877–79 measurements were performed under the auspices of Simon Newcomb, who was also working on measuring the speed of light. Michelson's setup incorporated several refinements on Foucault's original arrangement. As seen in Figure 4, Michelson placed the rotating mirror R near the principal focus of lens L (i.e. the focal point given incident parallel rays of light). If the rotating mirror R were exactly at the principal focus, the moving image of the slit would remain upon the distant plane mirror M (equal in diameter to lens L) as long as the axis of the pencil of light remained on the lens, this being true regardless of the RM distance. Michelson was thus able to increase the RM distance to nearly 2000 feet. To achieve a reasonable value for the RS distance, Michelson used an extremely long focal length lens (150 feet) and compromised on the design by placing R about 15 feet closer to L than the principal focus. This allowed an RS distance of between 28.5 to 33.3 feet. He used carefully calibrated tuning forks to monitor the rotation rate of the air-turbine-powered mirror R, and he would typically measure displacements of the slit image on the order of 115 mm. His 1879 figure for the speed of light, 299944±51 km/s, was within about 0.05% of the modern value. His 1926 repeat of the experiment incorporated still further refinements such as the use of polygonal prism-shaped rotating mirrors (enabling a brighter image) having from eight through sixteen facets and a 22 mile baseline surveyed to fractional parts-per-million accuracy. His figure of 299,796±4 km/s was only about 4 km/s higher than the current accepted value. Michelson's final 1931 attempt to measure the speed of light in vacuum was interrupted by his death. Although his experiment was completed posthumously by F. G. Pease and F. Pearson, various factors militated against a measurement of highest accuracy, including an earthquake which disturbed the baseline measurement.

See also

Speed of light § Measurement
Fizeau's measurement of the speed of light in water
Fizeau's measurement of the speed of light in air

Footnotes

References

External links

Relative speed of light measurements
  "Sur un système d'expériences à l'aide duquel la théorie de l'émission et celle des ondes seront soumises à des épreuves décisives." by F. Arago (1838)
 Sur les vitesses relatives de la lumière dans l'air et dans l'eau / par Léon Foucault (1853)
 "Sur l'Experience relative a la vitesse comparative de la lumiere dans l'air et dans l'eau." by H. Fizeau and L. Breguet (1850)

Absolute speed of light measurements

 Mesure de la vitesse de la lumière ; Étude optique des surfaces / mémoires de Léon Foucault (1913)

Classroom demonstrations
 Speed of Light (The Foucault Method)
 Measuring the Speed of Light (video, Foucault method) BYU Physics & Astronomy

Optical metrology
Physics experiments